John Russell Evans (born 1935) is a former Welsh international lawn bowler.

Bowls career
He won a bronze medal in the triples at the 1972 World Outdoor Bowls Championship in Worthing. He also won a bronze medal in singles at the 1978 Commonwealth Games in Edmonton.

He joined the Barry Athletic Bowls Club in 1951 and is a four times Welsh National Champion, winning the singles in 1976 & 1977 and the fours in 1963 & 1969.

He has also won two British Isles Bowls Championships titles, the singles in 1978 and the fours in 1964.

References

1935 births
Living people
Welsh male bowls players
Bowls players at the 1974 British Commonwealth Games
Bowls players at the 1978 Commonwealth Games
Commonwealth Games bronze medallists for Wales
Commonwealth Games medallists in lawn bowls
Medallists at the 1978 Commonwealth Games